Roberto Cosolini (born 14 May 1956) is an Italian politician who served as Mayor of Trieste from 2011 to 2016.

Biography
Cosolini began his career in the 1980s as provincial secretary, and then regional secretary, of the National Confederation of Crafts and Small and Medium-Sized Enterprises. In 2003, with the election of Riccardo Illy as President of Friuli-Venezia Giulia, Cosolini is appointed Regional Councilor for Labor, Education, Universities and Research.

After winning the centre-left primaries for the candidacy for the office of mayor of Trieste, Cosolini is elected mayor in May 2011. In 2016, Cosolini tries to achieve the reconfirmation, but he is defeated by his predecessor and centre-right candidate Roberto Dipiazza.

References

External links
 Official website

1956 births
Living people
Democratic Party (Italy) politicians
Mayors of Trieste